Benjamin Franklin Hanser Jones (March 18, 1899 – May 17, 1929) was a professional football player during the early years of the National Football League (NFL). Jones won an NFL championship with the Canton Bulldogs in 1923, one with the Cleveland Bulldogs in 1924, and another with the Frankford Yellow Jackets in 1926. He finished his career with the Chicago Cardinals in 1928. Jones died on May 17, 1929 at the age of 30. The cause of death was due to gas inhalation after he was exposed to an explosion at a clinic, located in Cleveland, Ohio, on May 15, 1929.

According to a front page article in the Simpson Times Leader in Ford City, Pennsylvania on May 22, 1929, Jim Thorpe, the former All-American football player, attended his funeral. Jones is buried at Woodland Cemetery, located in Grove City, Pennsylvania.

References

External links
 

1899 births
1929 deaths
American football fullbacks
American football halfbacks
Canton Bulldogs players
Chicago Cardinals players
Cleveland Bulldogs players
Frankford Yellow Jackets players
Grove City Wolverines football players
IUP Crimson Hawks football players
Millville Football & Athletic Club players
People from Bloomsburg, Pennsylvania
Players of American football from Pennsylvania
Burials in Pennsylvania